The Commander of the Armed Forces is the highest-ranking military officer of in the Armed Forces of Malta, who is responsible for maintaining the operational command of the military. The current commander is Brigadier Clinton J. O'Neill.

List of Commanders

References

Military of Malta
Malta